Esophageal can refer to:

 The esophagus
 Esophageal arteries
 Esophageal glands
 Esophageal cancer